Caldwell Airport may refer to:

 Caldwell Industrial Airport, near Caldwell, Idaho, United States (FAA: EUL)
 Caldwell Municipal Airport (Kansas) in Caldwell, Kansas, United States (FAA: 01K)
 Caldwell Municipal Airport (Texas) in Caldwell, Texas, United States (FAA: RWV)
 Essex County Airport in Fairfield, New Jersey, United States; near Caldwell, NJ (FAA: CDW)